La Côte International School Aubonne (LCIS) is a private, co-educational international school in Aubonne, Switzerland, serving both international and local families with children aged 3-18 years old. The school is a part of the Nord Anglia Education network of international schools. It has around 430 students representing more than 40 nationalities.

Accreditation
LCIS is a member of the Swiss Group of International Schools (SGIS).

Academic programme 
La Côte International School Aubonne delivers accredited international curricula accepted by universities around the world.
LCIS offers English and bilingual pathways to its students. It follows the Early Years Foundation Stage for children aged 3 - 5 years old. The Primary curriculum (Year 1 - 6) incorporates aspects of the English National Curriculum and the International Primary Curriculum. The Secondary curriculum offers the International General Certificate of Secondary Education (IGCSE) in Year 10 and 11 and leads to the International Baccalaureate Diploma Programme (IBDP) in Years 12 and 13.

Campus 
La Côte International School Aubonne is located between Lausanne and Geneva, in the La Côte region near Lac Léman, the Jura Mountains and the Swiss Alps. The campus was completed in 2014 and includes a gymnasium, theatre, music rooms, a film department and design and art studios.

History
The school was established in Mont-sur-Rolle in September 2008 with seven staff members and 42 children. 
The following year the school moved to a new location, in Vich, near Gland. 
La Côte International School Aubonne became a member of the Nord Anglia Education group of schools in September 2011. As of March 2023, the group consists of 81 international day and boarding schools in 32 countries, making La Côte International School Aubonne part of a global family of premium schools.
In 2014 the school moved to a new, purpose-built campus in Aubonne.

References

External links

 La Côte International School

International schools in Switzerland
2008 establishments in Switzerland
Secondary schools in Switzerland
Educational institutions established in 2008
Buildings and structures in the canton of Vaud
Nord Anglia Education